Sturdivant is a surname. Notable people with the surname include:

 Ephraim Sturdivant (1782-1868), American veteran of the War of 1812
 James Holmes Sturdivant, research associate of Linus Pauling at Caltech
 John Sturdivant (born 1956), American football player
 Quan Sturdivant (born 1988), American football player
 Tom Sturdivant (1930-2009), American baseball player
 Trinton Sturdivant (born 1989), American football player